Sota is a village in Sota district, Merauke Regency in South Papua province, Indonesia. Its population is 1300. Sota and Jayapura are the only places with a direct road connection from Indonesia to Papua New Guinea.

Climate
Sota has a tropical monsoon climate (Am) with moderate to little rainfall from May to November and heavy rainfall from December to April.

References

Villages in South Papua